These are the Billboard magazine R&B singles chart number one hits of 1996:

Chart history

See also
1996 in music
List of number-one R&B hits (United States)
List of number-one R&B albums of 1996 (U.S.)

References

1996
United States R and B
1996 in American music